The High School Attached to Northeast Normal University, colloquially Dong Bei Shi Da Fu Zhong abbreviated to DBSDFZ (Chinese: 东北师大附中), is the affiliated high school of Northeast Normal University, and is often regarded as one of the most prestigious high schools in People's Republic of China, and consistently ranked at top 4 best high schools nationwide in many rankings. It has established sister school links with Hilltop High School of Chula Vista, No. 42 High School of Vladivostok and many other high schools. In a 2016 ranking of Chinese high schools that send students to study in American universities, DBSDFZ ranked number 43 in mainland China in terms of the number of students entering top American universities.

History
The High School Attached to Northeast Normal University was established in 1950,and Chen Yuanhui was appointed as the first headmaster. At the end of 1950s,the school was rated as"the key high school of Jilin Province".In 1960,it was renamed as The High School Attached to Jilin Normal University.In 1972,it was renamed as Changchun No.66 High School.In 1984,its name was restored as its initial name.

Campus arrangement
The school has six campuses now, including the main site (Ziyou Rd) where Year 10 and Year 12 were located, together with Qinghua Rd Campus currently occupied by Year 10s and 11s as well as Mingzhu Campus for Years 1 to 9.

Another campus is located in the Jingyue Development Zone.

One of the other two campuses is located in Beijing, called Chao Yang Campus.

In the year of 2015, Changchun No.26 Middle School became one more campus of the school where Year 7 to Year 9 were located. And the new campus is called Xin Cheng.

Notable alumni
Liu Xiaobo, who won a Nobel Peace Prize for his high-profile opposition to the Chinese government.
Wang Zhongyu, former senior regional official and politician in China.
Sun Taoran, entrepreneur, founder of Lakala Payment and BlueFocus.
Li Sisi, Chinese television host and media personality.
Jia Zhijie, former senior regional official and politician in China.
Wang Guosheng (general), served as commander of the Lanzhou Military Region .

See also

History of education in China#People's Republic
Jilin City No.1 High School
Jilin Yuwen High School

References

External links

 School website (Chinese)
 Students community (Chinese)

Northeast Normal University
High schools in Jilin